Jamison Sint Jago (born 27 March 2002) is a Bonaire footballer who currently plays for SV Vespo, and the Bonaire national football team.

Club career
Domestically, Sint Jago came up through the ranks of Real Rincon of the Bonaire League. In November 2020 he joined UD La Albatalía-La Arboleja of the Spanish Segunda Autonómica. With the move he became the first player from Bonaire to play in Spain.  In January 2021 he moved to UD Los Garres of the same league.

International career
Sint Jago represented Bonaire at the youth level in 2019 CONCACAF U-17 Championship qualifying. He scored in Bonaire’s 4–2 victory over the Bahamas.

He made his senior international debut on 6 September 2019 in a 2019–20 CONCACAF Nations League C match against the British Virgin Islands.

International statistics

References

External links
 
 
 
 
 

2000 births
Living people
Association football defenders
Bonaire international footballers
Bonaire footballers